William H 'Doc' Eason (born July 22, 1947) is an American magician who specializes in bar magic. For 27 years, he was the featured entertainer at John Denver's World Famous Tower Comedy/ Magic Bar in Snowmass Village, CO. (1977–2004). He is also a corporate entertainer, lecturer, public speaker, author, teacher, consultant and recently was involved in the Fox TV show "Masters of Illusion". He talks to corporate and association groups about "The Therapy of Laughter" and connecting with customers.

Widely recognized as one of the premier bar magicians of our time, he has lectured on the subject all over the US as well as Australia, Canada, England, Scotland, Netherlands, Austria, Germany, Denmark, Sweden and Norway and most recently Japan.

Eason credits magician Bob Sheets as one of his significant influences. He also names Steve Spill, J. C. Wagner, Eddie Houlihan, Eddie Goldstein, and Bob Read as influences.

Awards 
In 2004 he was the recipient of the first ever W. C. Fields Magic Bartender of the Year by the prestigious Magic Castle in Hollywood, where he regularly performs.

In 2008, he was awarded Closeup Magician of the Year from the Magic Castle in Hollywood. In 2009  he was awarded Closeup Magician of the Year and Lecturer of the Year.

In 2016, he was awarded Lecturer of the Year from the Academy of Magic Arts at the Magic Castle in Hollywood.

Publications 

Fusillade, Notes on the Multiple Selection of Cards, By Doc Eason (coauthored with Paul Cummins)
Shot In The Act, Notes From The Working Repertoire, By Doc Eason
Aspen Bar Magic - Magical Arts Journal, By Doc Eason (coauthored by Michael Ammar)

References

External links 
  Doc Eason Magic

1947 births
Living people
American magicians
Academy of Magical Arts Bar Magician of the Year winners
Academy of Magical Arts Close-Up Magician of the Year winners
Academy of Magical Arts Lecturer of the Year winners